Mohamad Zein El Abidine Ali Tahan (born 20 April 1988), known as Mohamad Zein Tahan or simply Zein Tahan, is a Lebanese footballer who plays as a full-back for  club Safa, whom he captains, and the Lebanon national team.

International career
Zein Tahan made his senior international debut for Lebanon on 29 May 2013, in a friendly against Oman. His first goal came on 19 December 2014, helping his side win 3–1 in a friendly against Pakistan. Zein Tahan was called up for the 2019 AFC Asian Cup squad, playing one game on 12 January 2019, against Saudi Arabia in a 2–0 defeat.

Style of play 
Mainly used as a right-back, Zein Tahan can also play on the left side. He known for both his defensive and offensive contribution down the flank.

Personal life 
His brother, Hussein Tahan, was also an international footballer for Lebanon.

Career statistics

International 

Scores and results list Lebanon's goal tally first, score column indicates score after each Zein Tahan goal.

Honours
Safa
 Lebanese Premier League: 2011–12, 2012–13, 2015–16
 Lebanese FA Cup: 2012–13
 Lebanese Elite Cup: 2009, 2012
 Lebanese Super Cup: 2013
 Lebanese Challenge Cup runner-up: 2022

Individual
 Lebanese Premier League Team of the Season: 2015–16, 2017–18
 Lebanese Challenge Cup top goalscorer: 2019

See also
 List of Lebanon international footballers
 List of association football families

Notes

References

External links

 
 
 
 
 
 

1988 births
Living people
Lebanese footballers
Lebanon international footballers
Lebanese Premier League players
Olympic Beirut players
AC Tripoli players
Safa SC players
People from Sidon District
Association football fullbacks
2019 AFC Asian Cup players